Commands represent actions to be carried out and states to reach (read more on Imperative mood). However, these actions and states are demanded, not posited as being either future, present or past. This means that commands have no primary tense. Notwithstanding, they may have a secondary tense because not all tasks are to be carried out right away (no tense), some are to be carried out after, while or before another event takes place (secondary tense).

No Tense

Positive commands 
The present imperative mood is the normal tense used for giving direct orders which the speaker wishes to be carried out at once. The active form can be made plural by adding -te:
 (Catullus)
'give me a thousand kisses, then a hundred!'

 (Livy)
'give me your right hands and your oath!'

Deponent verbs such as  'I set out' or  'I follow' have an imperative ending in -re or -minī (plural):
 (Cicero)
'the gates are open: depart!'

 (Terence)
'follow me this way inside, both of you'

The future can also be used for polite requests, as when Cicero sends greetings to his friend Atticus's wife and daughter:
 (Cicero)
'please give my greetings to Pilia and Attica'

Negative commands 
An imperative is usually made negative by using  (literally, 'be unwilling!') plus the infinitive:
 (Seneca the Elder)
'don't be surprised'

However, in poetry an imperative can sometimes be made negative with the particle nē:
 (Virgil)
'do not terrify me, who am already scared, obscene birds!'

A negative order can also use the perfect subjunctive: 
 (Cicero)
'do not be afraid on my account'

In later Latin,  plus the present subjunctive became more common, for example in the Vulgate Bible. In the following example the first three verbs use the present subjunctive, and the third the perfect subjunctive:
 (Mark, 10.19)
'do not commit adultery, do not kill, do not steal, do not speak false testimony'

Secondary tense 

A command can be made for someone to do something at some point in time after the command, however a command can be temporally located. In this case, the task is to be carried out before, during or after a future event or within a future time window and is represented by 'future imperative' verbs. This mode of representing tasks is very frequent in text by early writers (Plautus and Cato) and sporadically found in texts by later authors (Cicero and Martial):

Other meanings of the 'future imperative' 

Some verbs have only the second imperative, for example  'know',  'remember'. In this case the imperative often has a present rather than future meaning:

 (Cicero)
'know that I have been blessed with a little son, and that Terentia is safe'

In theory there is also a future passive imperative, but it is extremely rare. It can be is either 2nd or 3rd person:

 (Ausonius)
'A spouse should be joined equal to equal' (or: 'Be joined as a spouse equal to an equal')

3rd person formal imperative
Related to the colloquial future imperative is the formal imperative (usually used in the 3rd person) of legal language, as in this invented law from Cicero's :

 (Cicero)
'there shall be two men with royal power; and from consulting they are to be called 'consuls'; they are to obey nobody; for them the welfare of the people shall be the supreme law'

According to J.G.F. Powell,  is not a genuine archaic form; in early Latin  is used only in deponent verbs and is 2nd or 3rd person singular.

Meminī, ōdī, nōvī

The future perfect and pluperfect of these verbs serve as the equivalent of a future or imperfect tense:  'I will remember',  'I remembered'.  has an imperative  'remember!' There is also a subjunctive which can be used in a hortatory sense:

 (Petronius)
'let us remember the living (not the dead)!'

References

Latin grammar
Grammatical tenses